The Church of St. Anne is a Roman Catholic church located at 13 św. Anny Street in the UNESCO-protected historic centre of Kraków, Poland. It is one of the leading examples of Polish Baroque architecture designed by Tylman van Gameren, but the church's history dates back to 14th century.

History 
The church was first mentioned in 1381 in the deed of donation of Sulisław I Nawoja of Grodziec. In 1407 the church was completely destroyed during a fire, but it was rebuilt the same year in the Gothic style by King Władysław II Jagiełło. The king also attached the Church formally to the Jagiellonian University by giving it the right to nominate the parish priest. In 1428 the choir was reconstructed and enlarged. By a charter dated 27 October 1535, St. Anne's was raised to the rank of a collegiate church.

In 1689 the Gothic edifice was demolished as it proved too small for the growing cult of Saint John Cantius, the patron saint of the Jagiellonian University who's laid to rest there. In 1689–1705 the new Baroque church was erected, modelled on Sant'Andrea della Valle in Rome. The architect was a Polonized Dutchman Tylman van Gameren, a chief architect at the court of John III Sobieski. The interior stucco decoration is the work of Baldassarre Fontana, and the polychromy assisted by painters and brothers Carlo and Innocente Monti and Karl Dankwart of Nysa. The painting of St. Anne in the high altar is the work of Jerzy Siemiginowski-Eleuter, court painter of King John III Sobieski. The 18th-century paintings in the stalls showing the life of Saint Anne are by Szymon Czechowicz. In the transept there is an altar of the adoration of the cross to the left, and the tomb of John Cantius to the right.

Gallery

See also 
 Churches of Kraków

Footnotes

Literature

External links 

 Homepage of the Collegiate Church of St. Anne

Anne
Baroque church buildings in Poland
Church buildings with domes
17th-century Roman Catholic church buildings in Poland